Three Live Ghosts  is a 1929 American Pre-Code comedy film directed by Thornton Freeland and starring Beryl Mercer, Harry Stubbs, and Joan Bennett; with Robert Montgomery, and Tenen Holtz. The screenplay concerns three veterans of World War I who return home to London after the armistice, only to find they have been mistakenly listed as dead. It was based on the 1920 play Three Live Ghosts by Frederic S. Isham.

Made in the early sound era when Hollywood savored any successful play and its dialogue, this film is a rendition of the Broadway play and also a remake of the 1922 Paramount silent, Three Live Ghosts. Mercer, McNaughton, and Allister would reprise their roles for a 1936 remake produced by Metro-Goldwyn-Mayer.

Cast
Beryl Mercer as Mrs. Gubbins
Hilda Vaughn as Peggy Woofers
Harry Stubbs as Bolton
Joan Bennett as Rose Gordon
Nanci Price as Alice
Charles McNaughton as Jimmie Grubbins
Robert Montgomery as William Foster
Claud Allister as Spoofy
Arthur Clayton as Paymaster
Tenen Holtz as Crockery Man
Shayle Gardner as Briggs
Jack Cooper as Benson
Jocelyn Lee as Lady Leicester

References

External links

1929 films
1929 comedy films
1920s English-language films
Silent American comedy films
American films based on plays
Films set in London
American remakes of British films
Films directed by Thornton Freeland
1929 directorial debut films
Sound film remakes of silent films
American black-and-white films
1920s American films